The Volga is an executive car that originated in the Soviet Union to replace the GAZ Pobeda in 1956. Their role in serving the Soviet nomenklatura made them a contemporary cultural icon. Several generations of the car have been produced.

Despite the continuous modernisations, GAZ found it increasingly difficult to keep the ageing design competitive in a market economy. GAZ CEO Bo Andersson decided to discontinue the Volga range in 2010.

First Generation, the GAZ-M-21

Development
The first Volga model was originally developed as a replacement for the GAZ-M20 Pobeda mid-size car which was produced from 1946. Despite its fastback design with Ponton body styling, the evolution of postwar automotive design and powertrain meant that in 1951 a brief was issued for its eventual replacement. In 1952 this matured into two projects: Zvezda ("Star"), an evolution of Pobeda's fastback contour with panoramic windows and large tailfins, and the Volga with its conventional styling, which was more realistically suited for production in the 1950s.

By the spring of 1954, the Volga prototypes were being test driven. The new car introduced a range of additions and advantages over the Pobeda. In addition to being larger, it had single panoramic forward and rear windscreens, a larger four-cylinder overhead-valve engine, central lubrication system of the main chassis elements, hypoid rear axle and an automatic hydromechanical gearbox. The car's exterior was designed by Lev Yeremeev and, though influenced by North American vehicles of the same period, the project was mostly independent, with an exception for the automatic transmission that was derived from the 3-speed Ford-O-Matic. After thorough testing of the car, which lasted for a further two years, a go-ahead was finally given by the state, and the first pre-production batch left GAZ on 10 October 1956.

Although there were many models and versions of the car, its production can nonetheless be split into three distinct generations and two derivatives. In total 639,478 Volgas were built from 1956 until 1970.

First series—the Star

The first prototype Volga appeared at a May 1955 trial from Moscow to the Crimea. While the Soviet leadership touted the speed of its development (begun 1954), only five cars were built in 1955. The first generation is easily identified by its characteristic chromed bar fascia with a central badge containing the five pointed star. Serial production began on 10 October 1956, with all vehicles being powered by a  flathead engine modified to produce . These were used in much publicised promotion drives across the whole Soviet Union, where they notched up to 30,000 kilometres. Unlike the Pobeda, Volga's engines were now to be produced at a specialised motor factory in Zavolzhye. Despite its hasty construction, it only began engine production in summer 1957, which meant that the first thousand or so vehicles were equipped with the Pobeda's flathead engine. Other features of this transitional series included the Spur gear rear axle from the ZIM and the manual 3-speed gearbox from the Pobeda. Drag coefficient was a surprisingly low 0.42.

The chromed bars, being a decorative element, required excessive manual labour to assemble, which was not feasible for a mass-produced vehicle. Moreover, they reduced the supporting strength of the front body panels. Finally, as the Soviet Union had great aspirations for the vehicle in generating foreign currency, it became immediately apparent that the military connotation would scare potential western customers. At the Soviet pavilion Expo 58, which opened in April, the featured example was the facelift prototype with the 16-slit shark-mouth grille; it also had the originally intended ZMZ  overhead valve inline four, the ZMZ-24. Now actually in mass production, priced at 5,400 rubles, the popularity and genuine interest in the vehicle sealed the fate of the "Star", and in November the "Star" was retired. In any case, in popular culture, the car's alternative nickname as "Zhukovka" survives to this date.

Despite its short production span, and only 32,000 cars being assembled, the "Star" was initially the Soviet automotive industry's first mass-produced vehicle to be equipped with an automatic transmission. It became apparent that such complex mechanism required a standard of service unavailable in the USSR. Even more problematic became the sourcing of transmission fluid, as these cars were originally only allocated for private ownership. Faced with such difficulties, a manual transmission became available, with synchromesh on the top two gears; it soon eclipsed the automatic, though it would remain in the production line-up until around 1960 for domestic models (1965 for export); only about 700 automatic-equipped cars were produced, most being 1958 models. The first generation contained the following models. These are listed in Russian alphabetical order, but not chronological. The base version, that was to have an automatic gearbox and the  engine was simply designated GAZ-M-21, without any suffixes. A taxicab version was called GAZ-M-21A, and featured the manual gearbox, but the identical ZMZ-21 engine. The "transitional" series was GAZ-M-21B for the taxi with the  engine (this was produced until late 1958, as most of the taxi parks used the Pobeda, and a common engine eased servicing). GAZ-M-21V was the next standard version (and proved the most common) with the  engine and manual transmission. The early GAZ-M-21G was the "transitional" series for the 1956–1957 years, with the  engine and ZIM's differential. Export versions were called GAZ-M-21D and GAZ-M-21E, manual and automatic respectively. Their difference from the domestic Volgas was a better quality trim and an uprated   engine. This was achieved by increasing the compression ratio to 7.2:1, to take advantage of the higher quality of gasoline that was available abroad.

Second series—the Shark

The 16-slit vertical grille for models from 1958 (which gave it the unofficial nickname Akula (Shark)) was not the only change by any means. Most of the changes came in February 1959, and included new front fenders with raised wheel arches, reflector glasses in the tail lights, a flock trim on the dashboard (later replaced by leatherette), a new radio with a metallic mesh speaker, windscreen washer and lock actuator on the boot. The following year was to have a new rear design with more contemporary tailfins , but this was not implemented. Instead, the car body received several reinforcement supports and the novel, but ultimately troublesome central lubrication system was removed.

 
The actual model designation of the Sharks was such that the automatic-equipped vehicles would retain the GAZ-M-21 with no suffix designation and the GAZ-M-21E (though by this point these have all but disappeared from the line-up). Also unchanged was the taxicab GAZ-M-21A. The base model, from February 1959 was now called GAZ-M-21I. Its export 80 hp vehicle now became the GAZ-M-21K. In addition to the engine, it now had a more extensive chrome trim elements on the exterior (including the mentioned grille) and improved upholstery inside. Russian customers could order the latter features, for an extra price, and such vehicles were called GAZ-M-21U.

In 1961, the Volga lost another characteristic icon, the removal of the deer mascot from the bonnet. A feature of both the "Star" and the "Shark", it became an iconic attribute of the 21st Volga, and Soviet automotive industry in general. Nonetheless, it was not only a common victim to hooligans, but also would divert splash stream right into the windscreen should the car pass a puddle at speed. Even more, it played a role in Pedestrian injury during accidental run-overs. Given its added cost, it was gradually phased out. In 1959 the taxi models gained a new droplet shaped object. In 1960 the deer was standard only on export cars and vehicles allocated for private ownership. In 1961, the deer could be found on the extra-trimmed GAZ-M-21Us. Simultaneously, two-tone colour schemes were also phased out from available options.

Third series—the Baleen

In 1962, the car was visibly modernised for the final time. Once again the radiator grille was changed, this time in favour of a new 36-slit design "Baleen" (Kitovy Us). The latter, would become a GAZ trademark that survives to date. The bonnet leaping deer mascot was completely removed, as was the longitudinal moulding. Generally, the car was characterised by a more sleek profile with the bumper overriders removed and the front indicators were also altered. Inside, the upholstery received new woollen seats and leatherette headliner. The engine was now  (due to new cylinder heads, which increased compression to 6.7:1, and new crankshaft), with no loss in fuel economy. (Export models got the  engine, with 7.65:1 compression.) Telescopic shock absorbers replaced the lever type ones (a change made in Series 2). The radio became optional. The mentioned optional chrome trim elements which were limited to the window arches were now joined by front and rear details on the top of the wings, "arrows" in front and "fintails" in rear. Models were as follows: M21L base sedan, M21M export variant, and M21T taxi. Also in 1962, an export version destined for countries with left-hand drive was developed, called the M21N. The M21U retained its designation for the more expensive version with optional trim.

In 1965, the car underwent a final modernisation. Changes included strengthened spars at the steering fixture and replacement of ball bearings in the wheel hubs with rollers. A new floor design, which allowed warm air to reach the rear legroom and a more fuel-efficient carburettor. There was also a proposed fourth generation to go visibly with the improvements, with a horizontal radiator grille. However, this venture was rejected due to costs and because such a change would not get the required government approval. Given that work was already undergoing on its successor, it was decided to continue production in this final form, up to 15 July 1970. In a much publicised event, on that day the final car left the assembly line, followed by the first GAZ-24 without a pause.

The 1965 modernisation also removed the -M- prefix from the name. Originally a feature of GAZ's early days, when it carried the name of Vyacheslav Molotov. The plant was renamed following the downfall of his career in 1957. However, the designation "M" was retained for current models. In the final line-up, the export model to countries with left-hand traffic became the GAZ-21P, the base model was now called GAZ-21R, export was the GAZ-21S, taxi became the GAZ-21TS, the version with optional chrome trim was now called GAZ-21US.

By 1965, the price had reached 6,455 rubles (plus 270 for a two-tone paint job).

Between 1960 and 1962, Volgas were shipped to the Belgian company Sobimpex without engines. Sobimpex installed a   diesel manufactured by Perkins. This was changed to a   Rover diesel in 1962. In 1968, a  Indénor diesel was also offered. The diesel, despite the higher cost, were "by far the most popular version in the Benelux countries", and both Sobimpex (later Scaldia-Volga) made strong effort selling them.

After the appearance of the GAZ-24, M21 exports stopped, though sales in the Eastern Bloc continued until 1970. Export sales were never strong, because the car was slow, had trouble climbing hills due to the carburetor design, and had design features not needed on Western Europe's better roads. Total sales of the M21 were 638,875. Approximately 470,000 third-generation GAZ-21s and were built, making it the most numerous of the three.

GAZ-22—the Shed 

Station wagons/estates never gained the same social status as sedans/saloons, and so were uncommon.

The station wagon/estate was included in the original design brief, which for its extra size was quickly dubbed saray (the shed). Mechanically, it was identical to the third generation of the sedan. The only difference was a strengthened leaf-spring rear suspension and the rear section. While the longer roof panel was serially stamped, the side panels were handmade, by taking the sedans, cutting off the rear section and welding on additional elements. The rear section was made of two doors, an upper window and a lower "picnic table". Other differences were the slightly bigger tyres, 7.10—15" instead of the 6.70—15" of the sedan.

Only those shipped abroad for export were sold to private customers. All domestic station wagons/estates, with a rare exceptions (such as Yuri Nikulin, requesting one for carrying his circus inventory), were never available for private ownership. The Soviet rationale was that allowing such a car to citizens would also make it too available and popular with dealers in the grey market economy, that was allowed but limited by the state.

Despite this, the "Shed" was a common sight on the Soviet streets, they were readily used as taxis, ambulances, in airports as escort vehicles with large "FOLLOW ME" signs painted on the rear window, and for official consumer duties. Thus, despite the spartan trim (only exported versions had the chrome details), much fewer GAZ-22s survive to date, making them a key item for collectors and restorers.

Models included the base model M22 (though no automatic transmission was ever used on the M22), M22B ambulance, M22G for export with chrome trim (with  engine), and M22K (with  engine). Export ambulances were thus M22BG and M22BK. In 1965, the car received a modernisation identical to the sedan. In the new lineup GAZ-22V became the base model, GAZ-22D—the ambulance. Export versions were now GAZ-22E and GAZ-22M for the 75 and 85 hp engines, whilst ambulances were GAZ-22EB and GAZ-22MB respectively.

The M22 was also the basis for a prototype four-wheel drive station wagon/estate, using GAZ-69 components, and a pickoupe; neither entered production. There was also a fuel injected M21 prototype, with higher compression; it was rejected as overly complex for the average driver to service.

M23 
In 1962 a very rare GAZ-M-23 model was introduced. Powered by the 195 hp  5.53 litre V8 from the GAZ-13 Chaika limousine, this car was developed for the KGB's 9th Directorate as an escort vehicle for motorcades, hence the unofficial nickname Dogonyalka (the "Chaser") or "The Double" (because it had a V8, rather than the more common straight four). To accommodate the additional weight of the big engine, the body and suspension required excessive reinforcing. Moreover, to handle the immense torque (three times more than a standard ZMZ-21A engine), not only was the Chaika's automatic transmission employed,  but a ballast steel plate was carried in the boot for traction to remain. In addition, it used the Chaika power steering; even so, KGB disliked them, due to their poor handling. Though never publicly restricted, nonetheless their existence was not widely circulated. For example, official driver's and service manuals published by GAZ mentioning all the Volgas, including specialised ambulances, simply ignored the GAZ-23. Hand-assembly was performed at the small-volume production unit within GAZ, alongside the Chaika limousines and other specialised vehicles. A total of 603 were made between 1962 and 1970.

Second generation, the GAZ-24, GAZ-3102 and GAZ-3110 
Development of the planned replacement for the GAZ-21 Volga began in 1961. At the time, the North American automotive industry was perceived as the global leader in design and innovation, and it inevitable for its Soviet counterpart to look up to it. Despite Nikita Khrushchev urging his country to "catch-up and overtake America", the Soviet command economy could not afford to match the American convention of altering the car for every model year, nor were its centralised factories physically capable of doing so. Thus a more conservative measure was taken, where a typical car would last 7–10 years on the conveyor, typical of Europe. GAZ-24 Volga was planned to have such a lifetime, lasting through the 1970s. However, even before its 1968 première, it was already behind schedule and as the USSR slipped into the Era of Stagnation, following Alexey Kosygin's 1965 Soviet economic reform, the car was to become an iconic feature of that era, both aesthetically and technically. Developed in the mid-1960s, and after the initial production run lasting more than a decade and a half it would go a series of modernisations and facelifts, and despite unsuccessful attempts to find a replacement (GAZ-3105, GAZ-3111 and the Siber), the car would finally be retired in 2009 - 40 years after the first series began production.

First series — the GAZ-24 (1970–1985)

 
Design of GAZ-21's replacement began in the early 1960s, and original sketches showed an evolution from the contoured body of the early 1960s to the more angular and rigid profile. The M24 was to introduce the popular measure economy of scale into the model range, where the same body would house different powertrains, mechanics and interior trim, and hence could me marketed as separate cars (platform sharing). GAZ hoped to employ this on the new Volga and a range was drawn where the entry model would carry the traditional, though modernised, four cylinder engine and manual transmission (the prototype appeared with a   V6). The first prototypes were built in 1966, and a year later the car was certified for production. For economic reasons a V6 model, despite showing promising results, was deemed unfeasible for mass production. The first batch of 24 vehicles were assembled in 1968, 215 more followed in 1969 and in a public ceremony held on 15 July 1970 the car superseded the GAZ-21 on conveyor without halting it.

Despite its more imposing appearance, the GAZ-24 was in fact  shorter in length and 120 mm in height, yet its wheelbase was extended by 10 mm. The lower body waist line, allowed the window area was to be increased, whilst using thinner linings in doors, roof and other body panels, notably increased interior space. The combination of this progressive design and a lower clearance gave it a much  lighter and more elegant aura.

The car was powered by a  ZMZ-24D engine, an evolution of the ZMZ-21A. Retaining the basic OHV configuration, it now ran on 92 RON gasoline (while the ZMZ-24-01 could use commonly available 76 octane, and the 24-07 could use liquid propane). The cylinder block was die cast, instead of the slower coquille for the 21A. The engine featured a twin-choke carburettor, with a higher compression ratio, producing  at 4500 rpm and an even more impressive  of torque at 2200–2400 RPM. Transmission was now fully synchronised four on floor layout. The brakes were improved, with a hydraulic vacuum servo unit (a licence-built Girling PowerStop), as well as an independent parking brake (rather than transmission brake of the GAZ-21). At the same time, certain features were retained for their proven reliability, like the kingpin front suspension and recirculating ball steering.

The car was built in several modifications and these were now indicated by numbers rather than letters. The sedan version was called GAZ-24. GAZ-24-01 was the taxi, which included a robust artificial leather interior and a slightly modified ZMZ-21A engine to run on 80 RON petrol. GAZ-24-02 was the estate wagon, introduced in 1972. Unlike the GAZ-22, it was serially assembled on a reserve conveyor, rather than out of sedan side panels. The rear, fifth, door was now a single unit that opened upwards instead of sideways. The car could seat eight people, due to a third row of seats in the cargo section. To allow maximum cargo volume and functionality, the seats in third and second rows were split (rather than a single bench) and could be folded independently of each other. GAZ-24-03 was the ambulance version of the -02. GAZ-24-04 was the taxi estate, with the powerplant and interior trim of the -01. In 1977 a GAZ-24-07 conversion kit was introduced for taxiparks. The GAZ-24-24 was the successor to the GAZ-23 "Chaser", with an identical V8 and automatic gearbox from the Chaika. Yet, unlike the -23, given the purpose of the car, even less effort was put in to differentiate it from standard vehicle due to costs. For example, the automatic selector was masked under a standard shifting lever. A small batch of export cars for countries with left-hand traffic was called GAZ-24-54 (less than a thousand examples built). GAZ-24-76 and -77 were export versions to Benelux countries, who would retrofit the cars with Indénor diesels and a more luxurious trim such as vinyl roof. Five experimental vehicles were built on the chassis of GAZ-69 4×4, called GAZ-24-95, one of which was known to be personally used by Leonid Brezhnev.

Though the vehicle never underwent a generational facelift on the scale of the GAZ-21 (if one does not count its derivative successors), nonetheless the car was modernised during production. The early stage included removal of bonnet-mounted rear-view mirrors, new ignition and boot locks. The novel belt-speedometer proved too complicated and was replaced by a standard arrow-driven one, as was the fate of the engine cooling coupling that controlled the ventilator fan (proved unreliable, the ventilator would be permanently on, whilst warm air for cold starts would be manually controlled with venetian-type shutter). Additions included external comfort lights were on the rear pillar's chrome element, that turned on upon opening of rear doors.

In the original design brief the GAZ-24 was to be retired by 1978, and though by that time work on a successor (the GAZ-3102) was underway, it was clear that the car would have to soldier on the conveyor for a foreseeable future. In 1977, following a 1976 report by NAMI on the Volga's major shortcomings (problematic steering prime among them), GAZ refused to update the GAZ-24's front suspension, instead making only cosmetic changes. (The front suspension would be unchanged until 2003, when the kingpins were changed to sealed ball joints, while the rear got an antiroll bar.) Visually, these Volgas can be identified by front and rear bumper overriders, front fog lights and rear reflectors integrated into a single block. Inside the car gained retractable seat belts, a new dashboard where all exposed metal elements were covered by plastic. In this final shape the car was produced until 1986, the estate until 1987. Including the GAZ-24-10, almost one and a half million such Volgas were produced.

Overall, the original Model 24 Volga was a major success. Like the GAZ-21, it remained a dream car for the Soviet consumer. However, unlike the GAZ-21 it cost almost twice as much, and given that its launch coincided with the launch of the VAZ plant, the more available Lada allowed for the Volga to rise in exclusivity. The lion's share of cars were used for the Soviet nomenklatura and the rest in taxi, police and ambulances. Private ownership would often be offered only to representatives of Soviet elite and celebrities. Given that it was possible to openly purchase a new Volga only via Beryozka chain (where it cost almost ten thousand rubles) its resale value would thus be several times higher than the stated nominal price. In both cases, the sum would be well outside the financial abilities of the Soviet working class. Thus, though the car was as iconic of its time as the predecessor, it was also become a symbolic feature of Social stratification in the USSR, and the Era of Stagnation during which it was produced. This more negative connotation began to disperse following the introduction of the GAZ-3102.

Whereas the GAZ-21 became a collectible by the Soviet Union's collapse, the GAZ-24 extended assembly line life meant that only in the late 2000s have prices for low-mileage mint-condition models and restoration interest began to climb.

(The  continued in production until 2008, by then only on special order.)

Production pursuit cars, which became available in 1986, were 31012s with the 5.5 liter (with one four-choke carburetor), fitted with a three-speed automatic and power steering (some with power windows and air conditioning), while the 31013 was the same, but with electronic ignition. These "were quite simply the fastest cars on Russian roads", and they got just . Their low-key appearance made them sleepers, though Soviet and Russian drivers soon learned to spot the extra radio aerials and dual exhausts. These cars were never true production models, "to all intents and purposes hand built". How many were made is unknown, the last being assembled in 1995.

Small numbers were built with the  two-rotor  VAZ-411-01 Wankel engine (which featured a 9.4:1 compression ratio) as the 31028. It was never common. There are reportedly also a few with the three-rotor VAZ 431 rotary, and with a pair of single-rotors operated independently (a bit like an Armstrong Siddeley Double Mamba). The rotary models were operated by KGB and traffic police, but these agencies preferred V8-powered 3102s.

There was also a prototype 31015 built in 1989, with a   Mercedes engine.

The GAZ-24 was the Eastern Bloc's largest family car, but proved difficult for families to actually obtain, with official purchases at first taking precedence.

Second series—the GAZ-3102 and derivatives

When launching the M24 Volga, GAZ envisioned an average, for the USSR, production run of a decade. The newer designs were produced by smaller numbers due to development of other projects in the Soviet automotive industry, in particular the coming about of the VAZ plant and a much bigger Moskvitch, the project 3-5, to replace the 408 and 412 series. The latter's being more economic would have proved a natural relieve the Volga of its traditional taxi role, leaving GAZ's new vehicle as a more exclusive personal luxury car for the mid-range Soviet nomenklatura. With this in mind, the vehicle's mock-up demonstrated in 1976 was to grow in size, have the V6 powerplant as standard, and a perspective 4.2 litre V8 optional with many other features of the contemporary foreign cars of the 1970s. In 1976-7, the new GAZ-3101 appeared in prototype form, but it was little more than "a cosmetic tart-up of the mainstream Volga", with new front door windows, door handles, and lights; it also got longer front overhang and longer trunk. This would be renamed the 3102 in time. A few were built with a  V8 as the 31011, but this never entered serial production, nor did the continuing GAZ-desired V6 model. (Among its standard features were a fire extinguisher.) Disk brakes were fitted in front, while the rear drums were equipped with a crude antiskid system.

Manufacture of the 3102 began in 1981, with its official launch the next year. However, such car would never see light, as the 1970s unrolled, the stagnation era effects has significantly thwarted any innovation in Soviet Union's planned economy structure. Moreover, the Minister of Automotive Industry, Viktor Polyakov, had open favouritism for the new VAZ giant, and thus neither AZLK's 3-5 project, nor GAZ's ambitious third-generation Volga would see their respective conveyors. In 1973 more economic solution was adopted for the future car, that rotated around giving a major upgrade to the GAZ-24 by replacing most of the mechanics, the body panels, the interior yet keeping the skeletal body sections and platform, thus avoiding the most costly replacement of production press stamping.

The first users of the 3102 were the KGB and other government bodies through 1983. It proved unavailable to the public until after the collapse of the Soviet Union. This limited availability has given the 3102 a particular cachet in Russia (even over the Mercedes common among the privileged), allowing GAZ sell it at a markup.

GAZ-3102 (1982–2009) 

By 1980 a replacement was developed, the GAZ-3102, which was based on the central platform and body of the GAZ-24, but with original fascia, interior, engine and chassis. However, political and economic stagnation of the late Brezhnev years continuously delayed the car's launch. When the first pre-production vehicles were evaluated by Party garages, the leadership was so impressed with the car, that they barred its mass production as to avoid devaluing its status by its use in taxicabs. As a result, from 1982 and all the way until 2008, the GAZ-3102 was produced in parallel with other Volgas, though in lesser smaller quantity. Originally having its own production line and many distinct features (including a novel, but ultimately unreliable stratified charge ignition), by 1997 the differences between production, trim and accessories of GAZ-3102 and latter Volga's remained only in its exterior. GAZ-3102 originally being an exclusive car for higher ranking authorities, retained its business image during the 1990s and well into the 2000s.

GAZ-24-10 (1985–1992) 

The GAZ-24 continued to be produced until 1985, when using some of the technical developments of GAZ-3102 was deeply modified, resulting in the GAZ-24-10. Starting with 24-10 the Volga began a slow transformation as the Perestroika reforms took shape. Though still remaining a status car, it quickly lost that prestige as market economy allowed free import of automobiles. However its simple and robust design and still good quality assembly, and the lack of a domestic light commercial vehicle the GAZ-24-10 was quickly seized by the new generation of commerce.

GAZ-31029 (1992–1997) 

In 1992 when the original machine tooling for the GAZ-24 body panels disintegrated, GAZ took the panels of GAZ-3102 and stripping them of any decorations, launched the GAZ-31029 Volga. Although being obsolete (kingpin front and leaf spring rear suspensions, front drum brakes, carburetted OHV engine etc.), production was doubled in quantity and halved in quality. As a result, the car transformed from a symbol of status into a disposable workhorse, barely meeting the astronomic demand of the emerging market economy.

Third series—the GAZ-3110 and 31105

GAZ-3110 (1997–2004)

Though deemed temporary until GAZ's own LCV cars, the GAZelle and Sobol, entered production, the GAZ-31029 Volga occupied a major market niche, and demand for the vehicle remained. Thus in 1997 GAZ modernised the car once more, creating original body panels, whilst retaining the GAZ-24's central shell. This removed the visual dissonance that the 31029 created, and by incorporating the chassis and powertrain developed for the new Gazelle families (which in turn were designed for the aborted GAZ-3103/04/05 Volgas), combined with a new interior resulted in GAZ-3110 model. Given the timing, with the 1998 financial crises that followed, which left many foreign equivalents outside the budget Russia's business and public alike, the GAZ-3110 proved a necessity rather than a cheap alternative during the post-crises years.

GAZ-31105 (2004–2009) 

GAZ-31105 was a second stage of the GAZ-3110's modernisation, though the designation was applied to cars produced from January 2004, the mechanical features were introduced almost a year earlier, and certain external ones were available in separate batches as standard or optional in others.

Limited production models

GAZ-3105 Volga (1992-1996) 

During the late 1980s GAZ developed a concept car for a future replacement for both the business -3102 Volga and the luxury limousine GAZ-14 Chaika. However the resulting GAZ-3105, which was never to be part of the Volga family, as it would be produced on the Chaika's conveyor (presently still used for the -3102) due to the economic problems never reached production.

GAZ-3111 Volga (1998-2004) 

The GAZ-3111 was scheduled to launch in 2000, but the factory's new owner Oleg Deripaska, was unimpressed with the vehicle visually and once again, the high price of the car prevented any interest to sales, as a result only 428 cars were built as part of the pre-production batch.

GAZ Volga Siber (2008-2010) 

Although GAZ was developing a "spiritual successor" to the 3111, the front-wheel drive Volga 3115, in December 2005 RusPromAvto, the parent company of GAZ, announced that production of Volga passenger cars would be phased out over a 2-year period, with production to end in 2007. GAZ stated that they would instead concentrate on their more profitable truck, bus, and commercial vehicle businesses. At the same time the announcement was made, GAZ also introduced the Volga 311055, a long wheelbase derivative of the 31105.  However, in the summer of 2006, GAZ reversed its earlier decision, announcing that further investments would be made in upgrading the styling and technology of the Volga saloons, keeping them in production as "retro" or "historical" vehicles. In early 2006, GAZ signed a deal with DaimlerChrysler to acquire the tooling and intellectual property rights for the Chrysler Sebring mid-size car design. GAZ stated that the new car would not carry the Volga brand.

When GAZ acquired the Chrysler Sebring license, it decided to further modify the car, and the Volga Siber was the result.
The Volga Siber was unveiled in August 2007, and production began in July 2008, with a goal of producing 20,000 units the first year. However, sales figures were not met and only 2,500 Sibers were built in all of 2009.

In total, about 9,000 cars were produced during the 2008–2010 production run.

See also 
 Black Volga

References

External links 

 / UK road test 1969 GAZ M-21 Volga 
 Owners club
 Volga Auto
 GAZ Website 
 Autosoviet on the Volga
 German Volga importer 
 About Volga GAZ-24 in English
 About Volga GAZ-21 in English
 Scaldia Volga M24D in English
 Jay Leno's Volga GAZ-21

 
Soviet automobiles
Soviet brands
Cars of Russia
Police vehicles
Executive cars
Sedans
Station wagons
Cars introduced in 1956
1960s cars
1970s cars
1980s cars
1990s cars
2000s cars
Rear-wheel-drive vehicles
1956 establishments in the Soviet Union
2010 disestablishments in Russia